Sui County may refer to the following locations in China:

Sui County, Henan (睢县), of Shangqiu Prefecture, Henan
Sui County, Hubei, of Suizhou Prefecture, Hubei
Suizhou, formerly named Sui County (随县), prefecture-level city of Hubei